Matthew Charles Czuchry (born May 20, 1977) is an American actor. He is known for his roles as Logan Huntzberger on The WB television series Gilmore Girls (2005–2007) and Cary Agos on the CBS television drama The Good Wife (2009–2016). Since 2018, he has starred as Conrad Hawkins on the Fox medical drama series The Resident.

Early life
Czuchry was born in Manchester, New Hampshire, and grew up in Johnson City, Tennessee. His father, Andrew Czuchry, is a professor at East Tennessee State University, and his mother, Sandra, is a homemaker. He is of Ukrainian descent on his father's side. He has two brothers and a sister.

He graduated from Science Hill High School in 1995 where he was Tennessee state prep tennis singles champion that year. Czuchry attended College of Charleston on a tennis scholarship, captained the men's tennis team, and was an NCAA ranked player in the Southern Conference. He won the Mr. College of Charleston pageant in 1998 and graduated with honors in 1999 with a Bachelor of Arts degree in history and political science.

Career

Television roles

Czuchry took one theater class in college, and his professor encouraged him to change his major to drama. It was during his first role on The WB's Young Americans that he met Kate Bosworth, whom he dated from 2000 to 2002. He also had guest spots on Freaks and Geeks, 7th Heaven, The Practice, Veronica Mars and Friday Night Lights. After recurring on the CBS television drama Hack and starring in the UPN pilot Jake 2.0, Czuchry received his breakthrough role as Logan Huntzberger on the television series Gilmore Girls in 2004. His role was initially recurring during the series' fifth season before being upgraded to a series regular during the sixth season.

From 2009 to 2016, Czuchry portrayed lawyer Cary Agos on the CBS drama The Good Wife. He also reprised his role as Logan Huntzberger on Netflix's reunion miniseries, Gilmore Girls: A Year in the Life (2016).

Czuchry currently stars in Fox's medical drama series The Resident, which premiered on January 21, 2018. He plays the titular character, Dr. Conrad Hawkins. The series was renewed for a second season on May 7, 2018, a third season on March 25, 2019, and a fourth season in May 2020. The drama has since been renewed for a fifth and sixth season.

Films
He appeared in the movies Eight Legged Freaks and Slap Her... She's French. Czuchry played the lead role in the film adaptation of Tucker Max's I Hope They Serve Beer in Hell.

Theater
From September 11 to October 28, 2007, Czuchry performed in Wendy Wasserstein's play Third opposite Christine Lahti at the Geffen Playhouse.

Filmography

Film

Television

References

External links
 

1977 births
American male film actors
American male television actors
American people of Ukrainian descent
College of Charleston alumni
Living people
Male actors from Tennessee
People from Johnson City, Tennessee